List of winners and nominees of the Anugerah Sukan Negara: Sportsman of the Year.

List of winners and nominees

References

See also
Anugerah Sukan Negara for Sportswoman of the Year
Athlete of the Year

Anugerah Sukan Negara